Lee Creek is a stream in the U.S. state of Nevada.

Lee Creek was named after Robert E. Lee (1807–1870), an American Civil War general.

References

Rivers of Elko County, Nevada
Rivers of Nevada